Caprie is a comune (municipality) in the Metropolitan City of Turin in the Italian region Piedmont, about  west of Turin.  
Caprie borders the following municipalities: Condove, Rubiana, Villar Dora, Sant'Ambrogio di Torino, and Chiusa di San Michele.

References

Cities and towns in Piedmont